Gunsmoke Trail is a 1938 American Western film directed by Sam Newfield and written by Fred Myton. The film stars Jack Randall, Louise Stanley, Al St. John, Henry Roquemore, Ted Adams and John Merton. The film was released on May 27, 1938, by Monogram Pictures.

Plot
After learning about Walters inheritance, Bill Larson kills him and steals his identity, Larson and his men then try to kill Walter's niece but Jack Lane stops them, now it is showdown time.

Cast          
Jack Randall as Jack Lane
Louise Stanley as Nola Day
Al St. John as Fuzzy 
Henry Roquemore as Moose Walters
Ted Adams as Loma
John Merton as Bill Larson / Moose Walters
Harry Strang as Stub
Jack Ingram as Ed
Kit Guard as Clem
Hal Price as Scroggins
Alan Bridge as Sheriff

References

External links
 

1938 films
1930s English-language films
American Western (genre) films
1938 Western (genre) films
Monogram Pictures films
Films directed by Sam Newfield
American black-and-white films
1930s American films